Calotes maria, called commonly the Khasi Hills forest lizard or Assam garden lizard, is a species of lizard in the family Agamidae. The species is endemic to South Asia.

Geographic range
C. maria is found in Northeast India (Khasi Hills in Assam, Meghalaya, and Mizoram) and in Bhutan. It is also reported from North-eastern Bangladesh.

Etymology
The specific name, maria, may be in honor of English conchologist Maria Emma Gray, the wife of John Edward Gray, the describer of this species.

Morphology
The body is compressed, whereas the tail is almost round, slender, feebly compressed, and covered with keeled scales. The head is large. Both males and females have moderately developed nuchal and dorsal crests. The dorsal colour is green with red streaks and spots. The male develops a brilliant red colour in its head during the breeding season.

Length:  snout–vent length,  tail length.

Vernacular names
 English: Khasi Hills forest lizard, Assam garden lizard
 Bengali: খাসি রক্তচোষা, খাসিয়া গিরিগিটি (Khasia girigiti ) (proposed)

Behavior
C. maria is arboreal and diurnal.

Habitat

Diet
C. maria is mainly insectivorous, i.e., feeds on insects. It is diurnal in its foraging behavior, i.e., active during daylight hours.

Reproduction
C. maria is oviparous. Like other lizards, it is also polygynandrous and promiscuous and both the male and the female mate with several partners.

Conservation
Despite its relatively small range, C. maria has been assessed as of "least concern" – it is facing no major threats affecting and is present in well-protected areas (Royal Manas National Park, Bhutan, and the adjacent Manas National Park, Assam; Lengteng Wildlife Sanctuary, Mizoram). It is a rare species.

References

Further reading
Boulenger GA (1885). Catalogue of the Lizards in the British Museum (Natural History). Second Edition. Volume I. ... Agamidæ. London: Trustees of the British Museum (Natural History). (Taylor and Francis, printers). xii + 436 pp. + Plates I-XXXII. (Calotes maria, pp. 322–323).
Boulenger GA (1890). The Fauna of British India, Including Ceylon and Burma. Reptilia and Batrachia. London: Secretary of State for India in Council. (Taylor and Francis, printers). xviii + 541 pp. (Calotes maria, pp. 136–137).
Günther ACLG (1864). The Reptiles of British India. London: The Ray Society. (Taylor and Francis, printers). xxvii + 452 pp. + Plates I-XXVI. (Calotes maria, pp. 144–145).
Smith MA (1935). The Fauna of British India, Including Ceylon and Burma. Reptilia and Amphibia. Vol. II.—Sauria. London: Secretary of State for India in Council. (Taylor and Francis, printers). xiii + 440 pp. + Plate I + 2 maps. (Calotes maria, pp. 193–194).

Calotes
Reptiles of Bhutan
Reptiles of India
Reptiles described in 1845
Taxa named by John Edward Gray